James Daniels is an American former Negro league pitcher who played in the 1940s.

Daniels played for the Birmingham Black Barons in 1943. In three recorded appearances on the mound, he posted a 4.76 ERA over 17 innings.

References

External links
 and Seamheads

Year of birth missing
Place of birth missing
Birmingham Black Barons players